The General Counsel of the Department of the Navy is the senior civilian lawyer in the U.S. Department of the Navy and is the senior legal adviser to the Secretary of the Navy.  The Office of the General Counsel of the Navy provides legal advice to the Secretary, the Under Secretary of the Navy and the various Assistant Secretaries of the Navy and their staffs.  The General Counsel of the Navy is the third highest-ranking civilian office in the Department of the Navy, behind the Secretary and Under Secretary of the Navy.

The General Counsel maintains a close working relationship with the Judge Advocate General of the Navy, the senior uniformed lawyer in the Department of the Navy who performs statutory duties under the Uniform Code of Military Justice.

The General Counsel manages nearly 650 attorneys worldwide, helps to oversee the Naval Criminal Investigative Service, and advises senior Navy and Marine Corps officials on litigation, acquisition, contractual, fiscal, environmental, property, personnel, legislative, ethics, and intelligence law issues.

General Counsels of the Navy, 1941—present
The first General Counsel of the Navy was appointed in 1941.  From 1862 to 1941, essentially the same function was provided by the Solicitor General of the Navy.

See also
 General Counsel of the Department of Defense
 General Counsel of the Army
 General Counsel of the Department of the Air Force

References

External links
 

Office of the Secretary of the Navy
 

1941 establishments in the United States